The Mighty Macs is a 2009 American sports drama film by director Tim Chambers. It stars Carla Gugino in the lead role of Cathy Rush, a Hall of Fame women's basketball coach. The film premiered in the 2009 Heartland Film Festival and was released theatrically in the United States on October 21, 2011 through indie film label Freestyle Releasing.

Plot

In 1971, Cathy Rush, a woman ahead of her time, takes a job as the head women's basketball coach at Immaculata College. Rush faces a challenge of trying to compete against perennial powerhouses. Seven members of the 1972 Immaculata championship team appear as nuns in a church scene early in the film, sitting together in a pew, passing a note from the Rush character to a student.

Cast
 Carla Gugino as Cathy Rush
 Ellen Burstyn as Mother St. John
 Marley Shelton as Sister Sunday
 David Boreanaz as Ed Rush
 Katie Hayek as Trish Sharkey
 Kim Blair as Lizanne Caufield
 Margaret Anne Florence as Rosemary Keenan
 Taylor Steel as Mimi Malone
 Kate Nowlin as Colleen McCann
 Meghan Sabia as Jen Galentino
 Phyllis Somerville as Sister Sister
 Tony Luke, Jr. as Salvator Galentino
 Kathy Romano as Gate Agent
 Joe Conklin as Game Announcer

Production
The film was filmed in 2007, but not released until 2011 due to the difficulties of finding a distributor. The director, Tim Chambers, had a potential  distribution deal with Disney, but turned it down because Disney wanted to add coarse language to earn PG rating, but Chambers preferred to go for a G rating. Chambers worked out a deal with Freestyle Releasing, and the movie opened four years after completing the filming.

Some scenes were shot at West Chester University in West Chester, Pennsylvania.

Some scenes were shot at The Hill School in Pottstown, Pennsylvania.

Some scenes were shot in Alfred Cope Hall Gymnasium at Cheyney University in Cheyney, Pennsylvania

Reception
The Mighty Macs received mixed reviews from critics. On Rotten Tomatoes, the film holds a rating of 46%, based on 50 reviews, with an average rating of 5.4/10. The site's consensus reads, "Its heart is obviously in the right place, but The Mighty Macs is too blandly formulaic to transcend the genre's many clichés." On Metacritic, the film has a rating of 49 out of 100, based on 19 critics, indicating "mixed or average reviews".

References

External links
 

2009 films
American basketball films
2009 drama films
Films about women's sports
Films set in Pennsylvania
Films set in 1972
American sports drama films
Films scored by William Ross
Sports films based on actual events
2000s English-language films
2000s American films
2000s sports drama films